Verdin is a species of penduline tit.

Verdin may also refer to:

The Verdin Company, American bell foundry
USS Verdin (AMS-38), American minesweeper
USS Verdin (ASR-17), American submarine rescue ship
Verdin baronets, extinct baronetcy
Verdin High School, former UK secondary school
Verdin, Iran (disambiguation), places in Iran

People
Sir Joseph Verdin, 1st Baronet, JP, DL (1838–1920), British salt industrialist and philanthropist
Robert Verdin (1836–1887), British salt industrialist, politician and philanthropist
Francisco Verdín y Molina (died 1675), Roman Catholic Bishop of Michoacán and later Bishop of Guadalajara

Carlos Torres-Verdin, academic
Clarence Verdin (born 1963), American football player
Danny Verdin (born 1964), American politician
Jaime Verdín Saldaña (born 1962), Mexican politician affiliated with the National Action Party
Julia Verdin, British independent film producer and founder of Rough Diamond Productions

See also 
 Verdi (disambiguation)